Basketball is the most popular sport in Lithuania. Lithuanian American basketball coaches and players in the 1930s helped the Lithuania men's national basketball team win the last EuroBasket tournaments prior to World War II, in 1937 and 1939, causing a massive impact in Lithuanian society and a basketball popularity spike. Since then, despite Lithuania's small size, with a population of just almost 2.9 million, the country's devotion to basketball has made them a traditional force of the sport in Europe.

Following the country's annexation by the Soviet Union during the war, Lithuanian players frequently formed the core of the Soviet national team, and the Lithuanian people strongly supported local club BC Žalgiris, particularly against Russian squads. After the restoration of Lithuanian independence in 1990, the national team was resurrected, with their first official tournament being the 1992 Olympics, where they won a bronze medal. The Lithuanians have since won another two bronzes at the Olympics, a bronze medal at the 2010 FIBA World Championship, and five EuroBasket medals, including the country's third title at FIBA EuroBasket 2003 in Sweden.

At the professional club level, Žalgiris of Kaunas won the top-tier EuroLeague in 1999 and the second-tier FIBA Saporta Cup in 1998 and was also the FIBA Intercontinental Cup champion in 1986 under Soviet occupation. BC Lietuvos Rytas of Vilnius won two times the second-tier EuroCup, in 2005 and 2009.

While basketball started being played in Lithuania by women, the women's national team has not achieved the same success as the male one, despite a title at EuroBasket Women 1997.

History

Interwar period (1920–1940)

Basketball was introduced in Lithuania indirectly through the European variety of Netball, featuring a smaller ball and no boards, brought by the Germans. In 1919 Lithuanian women athletes started organizing, and in 1920-1921 they started playing the game in public. The female pioneerism delayed basketball's widespread popularity until the 1930s as it kept being considered a woman's sport. In the meantime, in 1922 Karolis Dineika released the book Krepšiasvydis vyrams (English: Basketball for men), and in 1926 pilot Steponas Darius, who would later be known for his transatlantic flight, published the first basketball rules in Lithuania.

Despite the fact that women were the first basketball players in Lithuania, the first official game was played by men. It took place on 23 April 1922 when Lietuvos Fizinio Lavinimo Sąjunga (English: Lithuanian Physical Education Union) played a game against Kaunas team, winning 8–6. That day is regarded as the beginning of basketball in Lithuania. The press at the time described the match by writing: "The game was very interesting and left positive impression on the spectators. The observers were fascinated by the game so much that they felt living in a quite cultured country by watching our quick, joyful players. ... The audience heartily rejoiced at the gameplay of the excellent basketball players and applauded after shots and passes by Steponas Darius and Viktoras Dineika. ... Krepšiasvydis game, organized for the first time in Lithuania, gave beautiful hopes that in the future this game could lead our sportsmen to greater achievements". Two years later, the first Lithuanian men's basketball tournament in Lithuania was organized, featuring two teams from LFLS and one from Lietuvos Dviračių Sąjunga (English: Lithuanian Cycles Union), and a course for basketball referees was held. The first class included Elena Garbačiauskienė and Steponas Darius. 

From 1926 to 1933, basketball saw its popularity decrease and get overshadowed by football. Basketball was played only during the summer period because there was no suitable indoor arena, and the game was mostly played by representatives of other sports, who allocated little time to it. The number of games played decreased, and the national championship was not even contested between 1929 and 1932. It started to change on 10 October 1934, the day where the Physical Culture Palace was opened in Kaunas. The building had a spacious hall with 200 seats, designed and built for tennis. To increase grip for tennis players, the hall had expensive cork floor installed, which cost over 30,000 LTL (over $5,000) when average teacher salary at the time was around 350–500 LTL and 150–180 LTL for an ordinary worker. Being suitable for indoor basketball, the Hall hosted its first game on 16 November 1934, and soon became the main center for basketball events. 

In 1935, Lithuania decided to promote a World Lithuanian Congress in temporary capital Kaunas, inviting ethnic Lithuanians from many countries to unite the Lithuanian culture. The Lithuanian American community of Chicago decided to sponsor a team of athletes to participate in this Congress. The delegation included a full basketball team, which included University of Notre Dame star Moose Krause (Edward Kriaučiūnas) and his brother Phil (Feliksas Kriaučiūnas); basketballers Benedict Budrikas, Anthony Lauraitis, Victor Yanzanaitis and Julius Petrulaitis; and multi-sport athletes Konstantinas "Konnie" Savickus, Juozas "Joseph" Zukas, Peter Barskis, Michael A. Lukas, and Kazys "Charles" Sedvilas. After the three-week congress, Zukas and Savickus stayed to teach basketball secrets to Lithuanians. Savickus in particular became a player-coach to the national team, which had just been trounced by inaugural European champions Latvia, 123–10. One year later, with Savickus leading the team and exploiting stalling techniques, Lithuania trailed only 14–7 at halftime before losing, 31–10. The Lithuanian press declared it a moral victory.

Also in 1936, Lithuania applied to become a member of FIBA and take part in international basketball competitions, the first being EuroBasket 1937, the second European basketball tournament that the Latvia Basketball Association would organize in Riga as reigning champions. Thus while basketball would become an Olympic sport at the 1936 Summer Olympics in Berlin, Lithuania decided not to take part in the tournament, instead preparing for the following year. During the Olympics, one of the gold medalists, Frank Lubin, was of Lithuanian heritage, and was invited to visit the Baltic nation by a Lithuanian official in attendance. Going by the Lithuanian name Pranas Lubinas, he spent five months there and served as the country's first knowledgeable coach, helping spread various basketball techniques. Filling in for Savickus, who had returned to Chicago, Lubinas led Lithuania to its first victory over Latvia, 36-25.

The preparations for the EuroBasket 1937 started slowly, with players training only 4 hours a week. At first, it was decided that the national team at the tournament would not include any Lithuanian Americans; however the decision was reversed with only one month remaining, once a Latvian newspaper had printed an extensive article about the second European championship considering Lithuania the weakest of all contestants. Lithuanian player Leonas Baltrūnas was shocked at the article and along with journalist Jonas Narbutas, used a translated version of it to request the inclusion of Lithuanian Americans to Vytautas Augustauskas, director of the Physical Culture Palace. After a telegram was sent to the USA, two players arrived one month prior to the tournament, Pranas Talzūnas and Feliksas Kriaučiūnas, the latter of whom was designated as player-coach. To keep secrecy on how Lithuanian Americans were strengthening the team, all preparation games were cancelled and instead prolonged training sessions before the trip to Riga were held behind closed doors. The national team was being prepared not only technically, but also physically. Even once the reinforcements were made public, opponents were skeptic, with Talzūnas later remembering other teams felt he and Kriaučiūnas were not quality players as "everyone thought that a good player must be tall, raising his hand and dunking into the basket."

The efforts were successful—the Lithuanians became the champions of Europe for the first time, defeating all their opponents and with Talzūnas being picked as the tournament's most valuable player. Following the final victory over Italy, the famous Lithuanian tenor Kipras Petrauskas even interrupted his performance at the State Theatre to joyfully announce the triumph of the national basketball team. The crowd then rose to their feet and together sang the Lithuanian anthem. The team returned to a warm reception, with thousands gathering at a train station in a way Kriaučiūnas compared to "like we, here in America, greet the president." Basketball regained its ground immediately, and had its popularity rise abruptly, especially among students. Gymnasium teams from almost all counties competed in student games, teams were assembled in firms and basketball courts appeared all around the country. According to future player Stepas Butautas, "In every yard hoops are being made from barrels. Children, teenagers are throwing balls into them, others—even a sock crammed with clouts. Our Veršvai Primary School teacher K. Požemecka built two poles, made hoops from a willow and said: 'We will play basketball'." Future team coach Vladas Garastas added that "as kids we started using a barrel to make a hoop. We didn't have a ball, we stuffed in grass or whatever we could find". Kriaučiūnas also coached the women's national team that did well at the first European women's basketball championship, organized in 1938 in Rome. With three victories in four games, the Lithuanian women finished second behind hosts Italy.

Lithuania was granted the right to organize the EuroBasket 1939. In addition, the Kaunas Sports Hall, Europe's first dedicated basketball arena, was built. In the competition, the team roster mostly consisted of Lithuanian Americans, with five American-born players: the returning Feliksas Kriaučiūnas (Chicago), Juozas Jurgėla (Chicago), Vytautas Budriūnas (Waukegan), Mykolas Ruzgys and Pranas Lubinas (Glendale). As a result, there were several protests from other nations. Lubinas, who was the designated player-coach, lead Lithuania to a second continental title, even scoring the buzzer-beater in the decisive game against Latvia, which warranted a 37–36 victory.

Team dissolution during World War II

After two consecutive EuroBasket titles, Pranas Lubinas dreamed of leading Lithuania at the 1940 Summer Olympics. Sadly, it remained only a dream as the World War II broke out one year before and the Olympics were cancelled. With Nazi Germany invading Europe and the Soviet Union occupying the Baltic states in 1940, the Lithuanian basketball players and basketball-supporting president Antanas Smetona left for safer countries such as the United States and Australia. Only a few of them had a chance to return to Lithuania in 1989-1990.  As a consequence, none of the European champions played for the Soviet Union after the war ended. The EuroBasket 1941 was due to take place in Lithuania as well, but was cancelled due to the war. Instead, Lithuania only hosted a Baltic states tournament organized at Kaunas Sports Hall in April 1941, beating Latvia 38–33 in front of 6000 spectators. Two months later, mass Soviet deportations from Lithuania began. Juozas Butrimas, Siberia deportations survivor, once said: "Our whole sports club was falsely accused of participating in an anti-Soviet Lithuanian resistance organization. In Siberia, we built a regulation basketball court. Basketball allowed us to have dignity, to retain our sense of humanity. How did I survived? Basketball gave a lot. They didn't bury me there".

During the rest of the war, with the Germans occupying Lithuania in November 1941 and the Soviets taking it back three years later, all the basketballers who did not escape the country went through difficult times. Vincas Sercevičius, often nicknamed as the second Lubinas, had to run away from German raids in 1943. Two years later, Sercevičius was a member of the Žalgiris Kaunas who refused to purposefully lose to CSKA Moscow, leading him and other teammates, along with coach Stasys Šačkus, to end up shipped to the Vorkuta Gulag by the Soviets.

Soviet period (1947–1990)

The first Soviet Union national basketball team was formed in 1947 to participate in EuroBasket 1947, immediately winning gold medals. The team had four Lithuanians: Stepas Butautas, Justinas Lagunavičius, Kazimieras Petkevičius and Vytautas Kulakauskas.

Given the Soviet Union was absent from the 1948 Summer Olympics, Lithuanian basketballers could only fulfill their dreams of playing on the Olympic stage at the 1952 Olympic Games, where they qualified by winning EuroBasket 1951. The Soviets got a silver medal, losing only two games against the United States, who had a height advantage—the shortest of their players was still taller than the highest Soviet—and would soon become the USSR's biggest rival. The team was led by Georgian player Otar Korkia (17.3 points per game), along with Lithuanians Stepas Butautas (10.6 points) and Kazimieras Petkevičius (8.1 points). Two other Lithuanians, Justinas Lagunavičius and Stanislovas Stonkus, were also in the team. The four are regarded as the first Lithuania-born Olympic basketball players. Years later, Modestas Paulauskas served as the Soviet Union captain starting in 1969, and would lead the USSR to an historic upset of the United States at the 1972 Olympic Games, making them the first Olympic champions other than the Americans.

According to journalist and future LKL employee Arūnas Pakula, "We felt like an occupied nation. We had no weapons to use. The only opportunity to prove ourselves against the Soviets was in basketball." Despite not being able to challenge the Soviet Union on basketball court, Lithuanians still did that in another way. Basketball club Žalgiris Kaunas, established in 1944 (just a few years after the country's occupation) with a name commemorating the Battle of Grunwald, became one of the main non-violent resistance ways. Games between Žalgiris and CSKA Moscow, a military basketball team mostly formed from best Soviet Union basketball players, were de facto games between Lithuania and the Soviet Union, and led to mass rallies of sorts once Lithuanians went to receive Žalgiris' players at airports after victories. The teams from Baltic states even tried to help each other during the Soviet tournaments, most notably in 1973. During the last round, the already qualified Žalgiris Kaunas deliberately lost to Kalev Tallinn, as admitted by Paulauskas: "We gave victory to Tallinn Kalev. That game meant nothing for us, while for Estonians it was crucial in order to avoid the fight for the survival in the highest league". During the Stagnation and subsequent dissolution of the Soviet Union, the success of Lithuanian basketball provided many moments to showcase their nationalism against the Soviet dominance. The 1981 students sport games in Vilnius had the locals attending in the Lithuanian green and yellow colors to see the national youth team led by Arvydas Sabonis and Šarūnas Marčiulionis defeat the Moscow squad. In the 1980s, Žalgiris defeated CSKA three times in a row for the USSR Premier Basketball League finals (1985–1987). One of their players, Sergejus Jovaiša, stated that in 1987 CSKA was even preparing a huge celebration with orchestra and flowers before the defeat. Žalgiris also won the 1986 Intercontinental Cup in Argentina, receiving much support from the home crowd against the Yugoslavs of Zagreb Cibona.  Their return to Europe attracted a huge crowd, with Žalgiris captain Valdemaras Chomičius stating that in Aleksotas Airport "it seemed that the whole Kaunas gathered that early morning."

In 1988, Atlanta Hawks which included its major star Dominique Wilkins became the first NBA club to visit Lithuania and played friendly game with the Soviet Union national team in the Vilnius Palace of Concerts and Sports. Later, the Soviet Union squad became Olympic champions in the 1988 Summer Olympics for the second and the last time, defeating the United States, 82–76, in the semi-finals and Yugoslavia 76–63 in the finals. The team mostly was led by four Lithuanians: Šarūnas Marčiulionis (18.1 points, 2.3 assists per game), Rimas Kurtinaitis (13.4 points, 3 rebounds), Arvydas Sabonis (13.3 points, 11.1 rebounds) and team captain Valdemaras Chomičius (7.4 points, 1.5 rebounds). Vytautas Landsbergis, the first head of state of Lithuania after its independence declaration from the Soviet Union, once said: "The majority of the team was made up of Lithuanians. So really Lithuania won that gold medal for the Soviet Union. But its name wasn't there. And that was another injustice that we had to correct".

Once Lithuania became the first Union Republic to declare independence on 11 March 1990, the Soviet Union national team did not even qualify for the EuroBasket 1991. During the 43 years where the Soviets had Lithuanian players, they managed to get with both male and female squads 17 Olympic medals (8 gold, 6 silver and 3 bronze), 17 World championship medals (11 gold, 5 silver and one bronze), and 51 EuroBasket medals (36 gold, 4 silver and 11 bronze). The occupation left many painful marks in Lithuania and Lithuanians' memory. Games between Žalgiris and CSKA, as well as games between Lithuania and Russian national teams, still have extra spice in them nowadays. Singing of the Lithuanian anthem before the professional club's games in Lithuania is still a rare tradition, rarely found outside the National Basketball Association in Europe.

Notable players (men)

Notable Lithuania national basketball team members

Notable Lithuanians who never played for Lithuania national basketball team

There have been a few notable Lithuanians who never played for Lithuania national basketball team in FIBA-organized tournaments or the Olympic Games. Most of those lived in the Lithuanian Soviet Socialist Republic, who only competed independently in tournaments between the United Republics.

Notable Lithuanian descent basketball players

Due to various reasons (especially because of the World Wars) many Lithuanians left their country. As a result of this, there is a group of notable basketball players of Lithuanian descent. A few even expressed interest in playing for the Lithuanian squad.

Basketball people of Lithuanian descent (list not including players)

Lithuanians in the NBA and the WNBA

Drafted, but never played in the NBA

Female players at the WNBA

References

Sources

External links